Tafsir al-Mazhari is a 13th-century AH tafsir of the Qur'an, written by the Sunni Islamic scholar Qadi Thanaullah Panipati. The tafsir was published by Nadwatul Musannifeen.

A Sunni site, quranicstudies.com, explains:
''This was written by Qadi Thanaullah Panipati (died 1225 Hijrah). He has named this tafseer as 'Al-Tafseer al-Mazhari, after the name of his spiritual master, Mirza Mazhar Jan-e-Janan Dehlavi. This tafseer of his is very simple and clear, and extremely useful to locate brief explanations of Qur'anic verses. Along with the elucidation of Qur'anic words, he has also taken up related narration's in ample details, and in doing so, he has made an effort to accept narration's after much more scrutiny as compared with other commentaries.

Overview
Tafsīr Mazhari was published by Nadwatul Musannifeen in ten volumes. It was later translated by Abd al-Dā'im Jalāli in to Urdu and published by Nadwatul Musannifeen in twelve volumes.

See also
List of Sunni books

References

External links
Tafsir Mazhari Urdu Translation in 10 Volumes - maktabah.org

Mazhari
Maturidi literature
Nadwatul Musannifeen
Sunni literature
Islamic literature
Indian non-fiction books
Indian religious texts
18th-century Indian books
Sufi tafsir
18th-century Arabic books